Kiliseburnu Tunnel, is a highway tunnel constructed in Giresun Province, northern Turkey. 

Kiliseburnu Tunnel is part of the Giresun-Trabzon Highway   within the Black Sea Coastal Highway, of which construction was carried out by the Turkish Projima Tunnel Construction Company. The -long twin-tube tunnel carrying two lanes of traffic in each direction is flanked by -long Arıdurak Tunnel in the west and -long Tirebolu-1 Tunnel in the east on the same highway.

The tunnel was opened to traffic on April 7, 2007 by Turkish Prime Minister Recep Tayyip Erdoğan.

References

External links
 Map of road tunnels in Turkey at General Directorate of Highways (Turkey) (KGM)

Road tunnels in Turkey
Transport in Giresun Province
Tunnels completed in 2007